Remoteness may refer to:
Remote (location), inaccessible places on land and places in the ocean which are far from land
Distance
 Remoteness (legal), the legal concept of how remotely possible a consequence is (or should have been foreseen to be)

See also
Remote (disambiguation)